Kartarpur is a town, near the city of Jalandhar in Jalandhar district in the Indian state of Punjab and is located in the Doaba region of the state. It was founded by the fifth Guru of the Sikhs, Guru Arjan.

History 
In April 1635, a battle occurred here between the Sikhs, led by Guru Hargobind, and the Mughals, having been instigated against the Sikhs by Painde Khan.

Geography
It has an average elevation of 228 metres (748 feet).
It is situated at a distance of 15 km from Jalandhar towards Amritsar on G.T. Road (National Highway 1).

Demographics
 India census, Kartarpur had a population of 25,152. Males constitute 54% of the population and females 46%. Kartarpur has an average literacy rate of 69%, higher than the national average of 59.5%: male literacy is 72%, and female literacy is 66%. In Kartarpur, 12% of the population is under six years of age. Kartarpur has 14 municipal wards.

Jang-e-Azadi Kartarpur Museum

Jang-e-Azadi Memorial is a memorial and museum being built in Kartarpur town of Punjab, India, in memory of contribution and sacrifices made by the Punjabi community in Indian independence movement .

Computer Institute
 CAL-C Computer Centre
 Elite Computer Institute
 AAPI Charitable Computer Institute
 Futech Computer Institute

Published Newspapers 
 Kartarpur Exclusive

Religion

Gurudwaras include:

Gurudwara Tham Sahib
Gurudwara Mata Gujri (Where Shri Guru Teg Bahadur and Jagat Mata Gujri got married in the year 1633. And this place is also called Nanaka Ghar of Guru Gobind Singh.)
Gurudwara Shri Mai Bhago
Gurudwara Shri Gangsar Sahib
Gurudwara Shri Tahli Sahib
Gurudwara Shaheed Baba Sangat Singh, Mohalla Charkhari wala
First Guru Granth Sahib (Adi Granth) is placed at Qila Kothi (Kartarpur Fort).
Gurdwara Pind Khusropur, Khusropur 
Ramgarhia gurdwara, Khusropur 
Gurdwara Basrampur, Basrampur.
Temples include:
Nathan Di Bagichi (Nath welfare society, Jande Sarai road). This temple belongs to Nath Samparadaye who worship Bhagwan Mahadev Shiv
Bhagwan Parshuram Mandir, Katani Gate, Kartarpur
Dera Baba Gurmukh Dass Maharaj, Chandan Nagar, Kartarpur
Shri Guru Ravidass Mandir Arya Nagar
Prachin Mata Chintpurni Mandir
Shiv Mandir Pandhian Mohalla, Kartarpur
Dera 108 Sant Baba Onkar Nath Maharaj Village Kala Bahian Dera Baba Onkar Nath is located in village Kala Bahian.
Shri Guru Valmik Mandir,Bakhu Nagal collany.

Locality
 Katni gate
 Kila Kothi
 Boli Wala Mohalla
 Mohalla Charkhari wala
 Delhi Gate Street
 Gupta Colony 
 Arya Nagar Kartarpur
 Chandan Nagar
 Vishvkarma Market

Gates
Kartarpur old town is a walled town and has five entry points referred to as gates.
 Main Gate (bazaar)
 Katni Gate
 Delhi Gate
 Dalyalpur Gate
 Furniture Market Gate

Transport
Kartarpur railway station is the main railway station of the town which is situated on Ambala–Attari line under Firozpur railway division of Northern Railway zone.

References

External links
 Jalandhar district
 

Cities and towns in Jalandhar district